Amir Khan may refer to:

Sports 
Amir Khan (Guyanese cricketer) (born 1992), Guyanese cricketer
Amir Khan (Indian cricketer), Indian cricketer
Ameer Khan (Pakistani cricketer) (born 1982), former first-class cricketer
Amir Khan (boxer) (born 1986), British professional boxer
Mohammad Amir Khan (cricketer)

Politics 
Amir Ahmad Khan, politician in the All India Muslim League
Amir Alam Khan, Indian politician
Amir Asghar Khan, prime minister of Iran
Amir Azam Khan (1912–1976)
Amir Farzand Khan, Pakistani politician
Amir Khan (politician), co-founder of the MQM-Haqiqi Pakistani political party and currently a leader of MQM
Amir Mohammad Khan (1910–1967), Malik of Kalabagh
Ameer Muhammad Khan (born 1972), Pakistani politician
Muhammad Amir Khan (1768–1834), Nawab of Tong

Military
Amir Khan I, Subedar of Thatta, Sindh, Pakistan during the reigns of Mughal Emperors, Jahangir and Shah Jahan
Amir Khan II (died 1698), Subedar of Kabul, Afghanistan during the reigns of Mughal Emperors, Shah Jahan and Alamgir I
Amir Khan III (died 1747), Subedar of Allahabad, Uttar Pradesh, India during the reigns of Mughal Emperor, Muhammad Shah
Amir Abdullah Khan, Emir of the First East Turkestan Republic
Amir Habibullah Khan, Emir of Afghanistan
Amir Yakoub Khan, Emir of Afghanistan

Others
Amir Khan (singer) (1912–1974), Indian classical singer
Amir Khan (Guantanamo captive 900), alternate name of Mohammed Jawad, Guantanamo captive 900
Amir Khan (EastEnders), fictional character
Amir Ullah Khan, Indian economist
Amir Khan, a character in the 2022 miniseries Ms. Marvel

See also 
Aamir Khan (born 1965), Indian film actor, director and producer
Aamir Khan (Marvel Cinematic Universe), fictional character in Ms. Marvel
Amar Khan, Pakistani actress, director and writer